Bushell v Faith [1970] AC 1099 is a UK company law case, concerning the possibility of weighting votes, and the relationship to section 184 of Companies Act 1948 (the predecessor of s 168 of the Companies Act 2006) which mandates that directors may be removed from a board by ordinary resolution (a simple majority of shareholder votes).

The decision is not relevant to companies listed on the London Stock Exchange as the listing rules refuse listing where the articles of association contain restrictions on removing the board of directors.

Facts
A property company called Bush Court (Southgate) Ltd owned a block of flats. There was £300 capital, 100 shares held by Mr Faith and the other 200 by his two sisters, Mrs Bushell and Dr Bayne. Article 9 of the company constitution said that under a resolution to remove a director, that director's shares would carry three votes each. When the two sisters tried to remove him, Mr Faith recorded 300 votes and the other two, 200 votes together.

Ungoed-Thomas J said that the article infringed s 184. The Court of Appeal (Harman LJ, Russell LJ and Karminski LJ) reversed this decision. The sisters appealed to the House of Lords.

Judgment
The House of Lords held that the provision was valid, because there was no express indication by Parliament that it intended otherwise.

Lord Reid, giving the first judgment said that

But he said that given the recognition of giving weighted votes was recognised in Table A, the former Model Articles in the Schedule attached to the Companies Act 1948, "we must take the law as we find it". He emphasised the possibility of reform in later enactments.

Lord Morris of Borth-y-Gest dissented in a short opinion. He said:

Lord Upjohn approved the provision. He emphasised the Court of Appeal's approval of the provision.

Lord Donovan said:

Significance
Companies listed on the London Stock Exchange may not circumvent s 168 by their articles. So this has effect for non-listed companies. The LSE would refuse listing.
Another technique for achieving the same result as in Bushell is to make three classes of shares, each with the right to appoint one director. You then have the protection against altering class rights. Or you could have a shareholder agreement.
A weighted voting provision could potentially found an unfair prejudice petition under Companies Act 2006 s 994. Also, possibility of application by director for winding up order under s 122(1)(g) Insolvency Act 1986 and Companies Act 2006 ss. 994-996).
A quorum provision could state a meeting is inquorate without a particular director. Again, this could give rise to a s 994 petition.

See also

United Kingdom company law
Report of the Committee on Company Law Amendment
Russell v Northern Bank Development Corp Ltd [1992] 1 WLR 588, a shareholder agreement to which the company was joined, to create no further share capital (contrary to what is now Companies Act 2006 s 617) was binding on shareholders but not the company

Notes

United Kingdom company case law
House of Lords cases
1970 in British law
1970 in case law